Paul Asiedu Osew (born 25 November 2000) is an English professional footballer who plays as a left back for  club Northampton Town.

Osew is a product of the Brentford and AFC Wimbledon academies and began his professional career with the latter club in 2019. He departed to join Northampton Town in 2023.

Career

Early years 
Osew began his youth career with spells as Chelsea Kicks and in the Evolution Sports & Health Academy. Following a rejection by Chelsea Academy for being "too small", he joined the Brentford academy at the age of 11. At age 15, Osew signed a scholarship deal with AFC Wimbledon, after previously being a part of the club's Foundation's College Education programme. During his time in the club's youth system, he was converted from a forward to a left back. During the first month of the 2017–18 season, Osew played the first senior matches of his career for Combined Counties League First Division club Raynes Park Vale, on an ad-hoc basis.

AFC Wimbledon 
After progressing into AFC Wimbledon's U23 team during the 2018–19 season, Osew signed his first professional contract with the League One club in April 2019. He was a regular inclusion in the first team squad during the truncated 2019–20 season and by the time his season was ended by a stress fracture to his tibia in March 2020, he had made 23 appearances and scored one goal. On 8 January 2020, Osew signed a contract extension and made 14 appearances during the 2020–21 season, scoring one goal. He improved his tally to 32 appearances during the 2021–22 season, which culminated in relegation to League Two. Osew proved his versatility as a utility player in defence and midfield during the season and scored one goal, with the only goal of an EFL Cup first round win over Charlton Athletic on 10 August 2022.

Osew was offered a new two-year contract in May 2022, but delayed signing it until 21 August 2022, due to a need to recover from injury. He returned to match play six days later and following six appearances, he was sidelined for two months with an ankle injury. Osew failed to appear again before agreeing a mutual termination of his contract on 1 February 2023. He made 76 appearances and scored three goals during  years as a professional with the club.

Northampton Town 
On 11 March 2023, Osew joined League Two club Northampton Town on a contract running until the end of the 2022–23 season.

Personal life
Born in England, Osew is of Ghanaian descent. He attended Sudbourne Primary School, Brixton and Southfields Academy, Southfields. Osew is a drummer and as of February 2022, was playing in church on Sundays. In March 2022, he became an ambassador for the AFC Wimbledon Education Hub at Plough Lane.

Career statistics

References

External links

Living people
English footballers
English people of Ghanaian descent
Association football fullbacks
AFC Wimbledon players
English Football League players
Black British sportspeople
2000 births
People from Wandsworth

English drummers
Northampton Town F.C. players